Hillcrest Hospital is a 77-bed general hospital located at 165 Tor Court, Pittsfield, Massachusetts. It was founded in 1908 by Dr. Charles Harper Richardson, who saw the need for a surgical hospital in the community. This was the 2nd hospital in Pittsfield at the time.

Hillcrest moved to its current location in 1951. In 1996 Hillcrest Hospital merged with Berkshire Medical Center, and is now (2021) the Hillcrest Campus of BMC.

Hillcrest Educational Foundation
Affiliated with Hillcrest is Hillcrest Educational Foundation, which provides special education to more than 500 children and adolescents with unique psychological and learning needs. It also provides dental services to 12,000 patients annually.

References

Buildings and structures in Pittsfield, Massachusetts
Hospitals in Berkshire County, Massachusetts